The Shan State Army – South (abbreviated SSA-S), also known simply as the Shan State Army, is the armed wing of the Restoration Council of Shan State (RCSS) and one of the largest insurgent groups in Myanmar (Burma). The SSA-S was led by Lieutenant General Yawd Serk until his resignation on 3 February 2014. Yawd Serk was reelected chairman of the RCSS shortly after his resignation and has remained chairman since.

History
On 26 January 1996, Lieutenant General Yawd Serk of the Shan United Revolutionary Army (SURA) led 800 soldiers under his command to central Shan State and established the Shan State Army – South, after he refused to surrender to government forces with fellow commander Khun Sa. He then recruited roughly a thousand more soldiers before returning to southern Shan State to establish the group's headquarters in Loi Tai Leng.

On 27 May 2000, the SSA-S formed the Restoration Council of Shan State (RCSS) as its political wing, and elected eleven Central Executive Committee members to lead the political front. Yawd Serk was elected chairman of the RCSS, and would remain in office until his resignation on 3 February 2014.

On 21 May 2005, the SSA-S pledged to work with the Shan State National Army (SSNA) against the then ruling military junta to achieve independence for Shan State. Later that year, the SSNA agreed to merge with the SSA-S.

In December 2008, the Shan State Congress (SSC) was formed in Loi Tai Leng under the aegis of Yawd Serk, which would exist until 2010. Its members included groups such as the Lahu Democratic Union (LDU), the Pa-O National Liberation Organisation (PNLO), the Restoration Council of Shan State, Tai Coordination Committee (TCC) and the Wa National Organisation (WNO).

Prior to the establishment of the SSC, the SSA-S maintained a six-member alliance with the Arakan Liberation Party (ALP), the Chin National Front (CNF), the Kachin Independence Organisation (KIO), the Karen National Union (KNU) and the Karenni National Progressive Party (KNPP); however, the alliance remained dormant for several years, prompting Yawd Serk to express his desire to revive the alliance in anticipation for the 2010 general election.

On 16 January 2012, the government and the SSA-S signed a mutual agreement with the following 11 points:
 To allow SSA-S headquarters in Homain sub-township and Mong Hat sub-township
 To negotiate and arrange the resettlement of SSA-S troops and their families in the locations mentioned in the first point
 The appointment by the SSA-S of village heads in the region, which would work with government official for township administration;
 Government soldiers in Homain sub-township and Mong Hat sub-township will give help to the SSA-S
 Both sides will discuss and negotiate to arrange for the security of SSA-S leaders
 Government troops and the SSA-S would negotiate to designate areas where they could enter border areas;
 Each side agreed to inform the other side in advance if one side wants to enter the other's control area with weapons
 To open liaison offices between the government and the SSA-S in Taunggyi, Kholam, Kengtung, Mong Hsat and Tachileik and trading offices in Muse and Nanhkam
 Government ministers will arrange for SSA-S members to run businesses and companies in accord with existing policies, by providing aid and the required technology
 To co-operate with the union government for regional development
 To co-operate with the government in making plan for battling drug trafficking

In February 2021, the Tatmadaw attacked RCSS’s camps in Hsipaw Township, breaking the Nationwide Ceasefire Agreement according to the RCSS.

Territory
The SSA-S has main 5 bases established across the Myanmar-Thailand border:
 Loi Tai Leng – its main base of operations, near Pang Mapha District, Mae Hong Son, Thailand
 Loi Moong Merng – near Muang District, Mae Hong Son, Thailand
 Loi Lam – near Wiang Haeng District, Chiang Mai, Thailand
 Loi Hsarm Hsip – near Fang district, Chiang Mai, Thailand
 Loi Gaw wann – near Mae Fa Luang District, Chiang Rai, Thailand

References

External links
 Shan State Army (SSA)
 Photos of United Wa State Army (UWSA) and Shan State Army – South (SSA-S) military outposts along the border of Thailand, Chiang Rai province Geopium.org

Shan militia groups
Paramilitary organisations based in Myanmar
Politics of Myanmar
1995 establishments in Myanmar